Samit Kumar Nandi (born January 2, 1967) is an Indian veterinary surgeon, radiologist and a professor at the West Bengal University of Animal and Fishery Sciences. Known for his use of biomaterials in animal orthopedic surgeries, Nandi's studies have been documented by way of a number of articles and ResearchGate, an online repository of scientific articles has listed 97 of them. Besides, he has published three books, which include Text Book On Veterinary Surgery and Radiology and Development and Applications of Varieties of Bioactive Glass Compositions in Dental Surgery, Third Generation Tissue Engineering, Orthopaedic Surgery and as Drug Delivery System. He has also contributed chapters to books published by others.and Characterization of Biomaterials. The Department of Biotechnology of the Government of India awarded him the National Bioscience Award for Career Development, one of the highest Indian science awards, for his contributions to biosciences in 2008.

Selected bibliography

Books

Chapters

Articles

See also 

 Veterinary surgery
 Implant (medicine)

Notes

References 

N-BIOS Prize recipients
Indian scientific authors
Living people
Medical doctors from West Bengal
Indian veterinarians
1967 births